Myiodoriops is a genus of tachinid flies in the family Tachinidae.

Species
Myiodoriops marginalis Townsend, 1935

Distribution
Trinidad and Tobago, Guyana.

References

Exoristinae
Diptera of North America
Diptera of South America
Tachinidae genera
Taxa named by Charles Henry Tyler Townsend
Monotypic Brachycera genera